Abdastartus is a genus of lace bugs in the family Tingidae. There are about five described species in Abdastartus.

Species
These five species belong to the genus Abdastartus:
 Abdastartus atrus (Motschulsky, 1863)
 Abdastartus longulus Drake, 1953
 Abdastartus muiri Drake, 1927
 Abdastartus sacchari Drake, 1930
 Abdastartus smetanai Péricart, 1992

References

Further reading

 
 
 
 
 
 
 
 
 
 
 

Tingidae
Articles created by Qbugbot